1985–86 Országos Bajnokság I (men's water polo) was the 80th water polo championship in Hungary. There were fourteen teams who played two round match for the title.

Final list 

* M: Matches W: Win D: Drawn L: Lost G+: Goals earned G-: Goals got P: Point

Sources 
Gyarmati Dezső: Aranykor (Hérodotosz Könyvkiadó és Értékesítő Bt., Budapest, 2002.)
A magyar sport évkönyve 1986

1985 in water polo
1985 in Hungarian sport
Seasons in Hungarian water polo competitions
1986 in water polo
1986 in Hungarian sport